Sporting Clube de Braga is a Portuguese sports club, from the city of Braga. The club was formed in 1921, but they only achieved their first title in the 1965–66 season, by winning the Taça de Portugal. Their football team plays at the Estádio Municipal de Braga, also known as The Quarry, which was built for UEFA Euro 2004.

Domestically, Braga has three Portuguese Cups (in 1965–66, 2015–16 and 2020–21), two Portuguese League Cups (in 2012–13 and 2019–20) and a Portuguese Football Federation Cup (in 1976–77) as well as reaching six other finals. In the 2000s, the club gradually became one of Portugal's most successful clubs, after the Big Three, and has also competed with success in the European competitions, winning the final edition of the UEFA Intertoto Cup in 2008 and reaching the final of the UEFA Europa League in 2011. After finishing in second place, for the first time, in the 2009–10 Primeira Liga, Braga achieved a place in the 2010–11 UEFA Champions League group stage, also for the first time in their history, by knocking out Celtic and Sevilla in the qualifying rounds. SC Braga would return to the UEFA Champions League group stage in 2012–13.

The table below shows the club's performance since its first presence in the second division in the 1942–43 season. This list details the club's achievements in major competitions, and the club's managers for each season.

Key

Div. = Division
Pos. = Position
Pld = Matches played
W = Matches won
D = Matches drawn
L = Matches lost
GF = Goals for
GA = Goals against
Pts = Points

QR = Qualifying round
Q1 = 1st qualifying round
Q2 = 2nd qualifying round
Q3 = 3rd qualifying round
PO = Play-off round
GS = Group stage
2nd GS = 2nd group stage
QF = Quarter-finals
SF = Semi-finals
RU = Runner-up
W = Winner

R1 = 1st round
R2 = 2nd round
R3 = 3rd round
R4 = 4th round
R5 = 5th round
n/a = competition not yet started or cancelled

Seasons (1975–present)

<small>
A.  Braga started season in the 2008 UEFA Intertoto Cup and then qualified for the 2008–09 UEFA Cup.
B.  Best league finish.
C.  First presence in the UEFA Champions League.
D.  Braga started season in the 2010–11 UEFA Champions League and later joined UEFA Europa League after finishing 3rd in the group stage.
E.  Best European competition finish.
Last updated: 15 May 2022

All seasons

Last updated: 15 May 2022
1 Braga started season in the IC and then qualified for the UC.
2 Braga started season in the CL and later joined EL after finishing 3rd in the group stage.Div. = Division; 1 = Portuguese League; 2DN = Second Division North; Pos. = Position; Pl = Match played; W = Win; D = Draw; L = Lost; GS = Goal scored; GA = Goal against; P = Points
CL = UEFA Champions League; CWC = UEFA Cup Winners' Cup; UC = UEFA Cup; EL = UEFA Europa League; IC = UEFA Intertoto Cup.

S.C. Braga
Braga